Eric Huang Po Ju (born 4 October 1990) is a Taiwan-born Singaporean actor, most notable for his role as Terry Khoo in the Singaporean hit film I Not Stupid.

Early life
Huang was born in Taichung, Taiwan, and moved to Singapore at an early age. He was cast alongside Shawn Lee and Joshua Ang in the film I Not Stupid, in 2002, after his school encouraged him to. His appearance in the sitcom version earned the three nominations for Best Young Actor at the 2002 Star Awards. Huang next starred in Homerun, working with Lee and Ang once more. Huang retired from the stage thereafter. He and Lee filmed their last movie in the J-Team produced film Colour of Hope.

Personal life
Huang attended United World College of South East Asia. He returned to Taiwan and is currently studying Risk Management and Insurance at National Chengchi University.

Filmography

Awards and nominations

References

Taiwanese male film actors
Taiwanese emigrants to Singapore
Singaporean male film actors
1990 births
Living people